Sir Rosevelt was an American electronic dance music group consisting of Zac Brown, Niko Moon, and Ben Simonetti. The group, formed in 2016, has released one album for Elektra Records.

History
Zac Brown, lead singer of Zac Brown Band, first announced Sir Rosevelt in 2016. The group's other members are Niko Moon, a frequent co-writer of Brown's, and Ben Simonetti, who provided programming for several tracks on Zac Brown Band's Jekyll + Hyde album. Initially, Brown did not reveal the other members of the group, nor did he provide any press after the release of their first song "Sunday Finest". Later in 2016, he announced the other members and released three more tracks. An album came in December 2017, with the single "Somethin' 'Bout You". Also preceding the album's release was another teaser track titled "The Bravest" which was used by the German television channel ZDF for the 2018 FIFA World Cup.

Discography

Albums

Singles

Music videos

References

American electronic dance music groups
Elektra Records artists
Musical groups established in 2016
Zac Brown Band
Musical groups from Nashville, Tennessee
2016 establishments in Tennessee